Whipsiderry is a coastal hamlet north of Newquay in Cornwall, England, United Kingdom.

References

Hamlets in Cornwall